Agona Senior High Technical School is a senior high school located at Agona in the Ashanti Region of Ghana.

See also

 Education in Ghana
 List of schools in Ghana

References

Ashanti Region
High schools in Ghana
Educational institutions established in 1901
1901 establishments in Africa